Lincoln Tye McFayden (born 11 February 2002) is an English professional footballer who plays as a left-back for the EFL Championship club Swansea City.

Career
McFayden joined the youth academy of Preston North End in 2011, and after a decade playing for them transferred to Swansea City on 5 May 2021. He made his professional debut with Swansea City in a 3–0 EFL Cup win over Reading on 10 August 2021.

References

External links
 

2002 births
Living people
Sportspeople from Chorley
English footballers
Swansea City A.F.C. players
Association football fullbacks